Trifolium angustifolium is a species of clover known by the common names narrowleaf crimson clover, narrow clover and narrow-leaved clover.

Distribution
It is native to Europe, Asia, and North Africa.  Trifolium angustifolium occurs in many types of habitat, including disturbed areas.

It can be found elsewhere as an introduced species, including an invasive species in parts of North America, such as California.

Description
Trifolium angustifolium is an annual herb growing erect in form. The leaves are divided into narrow leaflets which are linear to lance-shaped and measure up to 4.5 centimeters long. The leaves have stipules tipped with bristles. The herbage is hairy in texture.

The inflorescence is a cylindrical spike of flowers measuring 1 to 5 centimeters long. Each flower has a calyx of sepals with long, hairy, needle-like lobes that harden into bristles as the plant dries. Within each calyx is a pink corolla about a centimeter long.

References

External links

Jepson Manual Treatment - Trifolium angustifolium

Trifolium angustifolium - Photo gallery

angustifolium
Flora of Europe
Flora of Western Asia
Flora of North Africa
Flora of Lebanon
Plants described in 1753
Taxa named by Carl Linnaeus